Vendôme Redoubt may refer to a number of redoubts in Malta:

Baħar iċ-Ċagħaq Redoubt in Naxxar
Dellia Battery in St. Paul's Bay
Ramla Redoubt in Xagħra
Vendôme Tower in Marsaxlokk